Pseudocossus viettei is a moth in the family Cossidae. It was described by Yakovlev in 2011. It is found in Madagascar.

References

Natural History Museum Lepidoptera generic names catalog

Moths described in 2011
Pseudocossinae